The short-snout sand-dragonet (Callionymus schaapii) is a species of dragonet native to the eastern Indian Ocean and the western Pacific Ocean where it is found at a depth of around .  It prefers muddy or sandy substrates, preferring areas near river mouths or estuaries.  This species grows to a length of  TL. The specific name honours Dirk François Schaap, a Dutch colonial administrator in the Dutch East Indies who lived on Bangka Island, Sumatra, who found this species.

References 

S
Fish described in 1852